Arti (Sanskrit: Ārātrika, Hindi: Ārtī) is a Hindu ritual employed in worship, often part of puja, in which light (usually from a flame) is offered to one or more deities. Arti(s) also refers to the songs sung in praise of the deity, when the light is being offered.

Origin
Arti is derived from the Sanskrit word  which means something that removes , darkness (or light waved in darkness before an icon).

Arti is said to have descended from the Vedic concept of fire rituals, or homa/yajna. In the traditional arti ceremony, the flower represents the earth (solidity), the water and accompanying handkerchief correspond with the water element (liquidity), the ghee or oil lamp represents the fire component (heat), the peacock fan conveys the precious quality of air (movement), and the yak-tail fan represents the subtle form of ether (space). The incense represents a purified state of mind, and one's "intelligence" is offered through the adherence to rules of timing and order of offerings. Thus, one's entire existence and all facets of material creation are symbolically offered to God via the arti ceremony. The word may also refer to the traditional Hindu devotional song that is sung during the ritual.

Practice
Arti can range from simple acts of worship to extravagant rituals, but always includes jyot (flame or light). It is sometimes performed one to five times daily, and usually at the end of a puja and bhajan session (in northern India). It is performed during almost all Hindu ceremonies and occasions. It involves the circulating of an "arti plate" or "arti lamp" around a person or deity and is generally accompanied by the congregation singing songs in praise of that deva or person - many versions exist. In most versions the plate, lamp, or flame represents the power of the deity. The priest circulates the plate or lamp to all those present. They cup their down-turned hands over the flame and then raise their palms to their forehead – the blessing has now been passed to the devotee.

The arti plate is generally made of metal, usually silver, bronze or copper. On it must repose a lamp made of kneaded flour, mud or metal, filled with oil or ghee. One or more cotton wicks (always an odd number) are put into the oil and then lighted, or camphor is burnt instead. The plate may also contain flowers, incense and akshata (rice). In some temples, a plate is not used and the priest holds the ghee lamp in his hand when offering it to the Deities.

The purpose of performing arti is the waving of lighted wicks before the deities in a spirit of humility and gratitude, wherein faithful followers become immersed in god's divine form. It symbolises the five elements: 
 Space
 Wind
 Fire
 Water
 Earth

Community arti is performed in the mandir; however, devotees also perform it in their homes.

Significance

Arti can be an expression of many things including love, benevolence, gratitude, prayers, or desires depending on the object it is done to/ for. For example, it can be a form of respect when performed to elders, prayers when performed to deities, or hope when performed for homes or vehicles. Emotions and prayers are often silent while doing arti, but this is determined by the person carrying out the ritual or the holiday involved. It's also believed that goodwill and luck can be taken through symbolic hand movements over the flame.

When arti is performed, the performer faces the deity of god (or divine element, e.g. Ganges river) and concentrates on the form of god by looking into the eyes of the deity (it is said that eyes are the windows to the soul) to get immersed. The flame of the arti illuminates the various parts of the deity so that the performer and onlookers may better see and concentrate on the form.  Arti is waved in circular fashion, in clockwise manner around the deity. After every circle (or second or third circle), when arti has reached the bottom (6–8 o'clock position), the performer waves it backwards while remaining in the bottom (4–6 o'clock position) and then continues waving it in clockwise fashion. The idea here is that arti represents our daily activities, which revolves around god, a center of our life. Looking at god while performing arti reminds the performer (and the attendees of the arti) to keep god at the center of all activities and reinforces the understanding that routine worldly activities are secondary in importance. This understanding would give the believers strength to withstand the unexpected grief and keeps them humble and remindful of god during happy moments. Apart from worldly activities arti also represents one's self - thus, arti signifies that one is peripheral to godhead or divinity. This would keep one's ego down and help one remain humble in spite of high social and economic rank. A third commonly held understanding of the ritual is that arti serves as a reminder to stay vigilant so that the forces of material pleasures and desires cannot overcome the individual. Just as the lighted wick provides light and chases away darkness, the vigilance of an individual can keep away the influence of the material world.

Arti is not only limited to god. Arti can performed not only to all forms of life, but also inanimate objects which help in progress of the culture. This is exemplified by performer of the arti waving arti to all the devotees as the arti comes to the end – signifying that everyone has a part of god within that the performer respects and bows down to. It is also a common practice to perform arti to inanimate objects like vehicles, electronics etc. at least when a Hindu starts using it, just as a gesture of showing respect and praying that this object would help one excel in the work one would use it for. It is similar to the ritual of doing auspicious red mark(s) using kanku (kumkum) and rice.

Songs

Hinduism has a long tradition of arti songs, simply referred to as arti, sung as an accompaniment to the ritual of arti. It primarily eulogizes  the deity that the ritual is being offered to, and several sects have their own versions of the common arti songs that are often sung on chorus at various temples, during evening and morning artis. Sometimes they also contain snippets of information on the life of the deity.

The most commonly sung arti is that which is dedicated to all deities called Om Jai Jagdish Hare, known as "the universal arti". Other arti's are used for other deities as well such as Om Jai Shiv omkara, Om Jai Lakshmi mata, Om Jai Ambe gauri, Om Jai Adya Shakti, Om Jai Saraswati Mata, Om Jai Gange Mata, Om Jai Tulsi Mata and Om Jai Surya Bhagvaan. In Ganesha worship, the arti "Sukhakarta Dukhaharta" is popular in Maharashtra.

In Swaminarayan Mandirs, Jay Sadguru Swami is the arti that is sung. In most temples in India, arti is performed at least twice a day, after the ceremonial puja, which is the time when the largest number of devotees congregates.

In Pushtimarg Havelis, arti is performed by a sole mukhiyaji (priest) while "Haveli Sangit" (kirtan) is being sung. Devotees only watch the arti being done and do not get to take a major part in it. During bhajan or utsavs (festivals) celebrated at home, "Jai Jai Shree Yamuna" is sung while devotees perform arti. It is said that Sandhya arti is done to see if Lord Shrinathji had gotten hurt while playing outside because it is performed after sundown.

In Sikhism the arti sung is Gagan mein thaal.

Gaudiya Vaishnavism

In Gaudiya Vaishnavism, arti refers to the whole puja ritual, of which offering the lamp is only one part. A shankha (conch) is blown to start the arti, then an odd number of incense sticks are offered to the deity. The lamp is offered next, and then circulated among the devotees. A conch is then filled with water, and offered; the water is then poured into a sprinkler and sprinkled over the devotees. A cloth and flowers are then offered, and the flowers are circulated to the devotees, who sniff them. The deity is then fanned with a camara whisk, and a peacock fan in hot countries.

Durga Puja

During the Bengali festival Durga puja ritual drummers – dhakis, carrying large leather-strung dhak's, show off their skills during ritual dance worships called arti or Dhunuchi dance.

Sikhism
Amritsari Sikhs have not been performing arti as Hindus perform, but instead sing arti kirtan, which are a few shabads from Guru Nanak, Ravidas and other Bhagats/Gurus. Nihangs recite Aarta before arti which includes some more shabads from the Dasam Granth and Sarabloh Granth. According to them, arti is the arti of divine wisdom, which is in form of Guru Granth Sahib. The concept is similar to bowing before Guru Granth Sahib on knees. Nihangs perform Aarti similar to how Hindus do (using lamps, incense, flowers, bells, conch shells at specific parts of the ceremony)

See also

 Arti (given name)
 Blessing
 Jai Jagdish Hare
 Jay Sadguru Swami
 Mantrapushpanjali
 Shankha

Notes

External links
 

Aarti
Hindu music